NGC 489 is probably an edge-on spiral galaxy located about 97 million Light-years away from Earth in the constellation Pisces. NGC 489's calculated velocity is 2507 km/s. NGC 489 was discovered by German astronomer Heinrich Louis d'Arrest on December 22, 1862.

Group Membership  
NGC 489 is a member of a group of galaxies known as the NGC 524 group.

See also  
 Spiral galaxy 
 List of NGC objects (1–1000)

References

External links 

Spiral galaxies
Pisces (constellation)
0489
4957
908
Astronomical objects discovered in 1862